The  Association for Library and Information Science Education (ALISE) is an American non-profit organisation to promote good practice in library and information science in educational establishments.

History 
ALISE is the successor organization to the  Association of American Library Schools (AALS) which was founded in 1900.  AALS replaced the American Library Association (ALA) Roundtable of Library School Instructors (1911-1915), but was not affiliated with the American Library Association until 1953. Organizationally, AALS and ALA had many connections, especially in the first 30 years of AALS’s existence. Donald G. Davis traced the efforts within ALA for the improvement of library education.

Journal of Education for Library and Information Science 
The Journal of Education for Library and Information Science (JELIS) is a quarterly scholarly periodical published by ALISE since 1960. It serves as the primary source of information about issues pertinent to LIS educators.

Presidents of the Association

2010-present

2019/20   Stephen Bajjaly, Wayne State University
2018/19.   Heidi Julien, University at Buffalo
2017/18.   Dietmar Wolfram, University of Wisconsin-Milwaukee    
2016/17.   Louise Spiteri, Dalhousie University    
2015/16.   Samantha Hastings, University of South Carolina    
2014/15.   Clara Chu, University of North Carolina at Greensboro    
2013/14.   Eileen Abels, Simmons College
2012/13.   Melissa Gross, Florida State University
2011/12.   Lynne C. Howarth, University of Toronto
2010/11.   Lorna Peterson, University at Buffalo, State University of New York

2000-2010

2009/10.   Linda Smith, University of Illinois, Urbana-Champaign
2008/09.   Michele V. Cloonan, Simmons College
2007/08.   Connie Van Fleet, University of Oklahoma
2006/07.   John Budd, University of Missouri - Columbia
2005/06.   Ken Haycock, San Jose State University
2003/05.   Louise S. Robbins, University of Wisconsin-Madison
2002/03.   Elizabeth Aversa, University of Tennessee
2001/02.   Prudence Dalrymple, Dominican University
2000/01.   James M. Matarazzo, Simmons College

1990-1999

1999/00.   Shirley Fitzgibbons, Indiana University
1998/99.   Shirley Fitzgibbons, Indiana University
1997/98.   Toni Carbo, University of Pittsburgh
1996/97.   Joan C. Durrance, University of Michigan
1995/96.   June Lester, University of Oklahoma
1994/95.   Charles Curran, University of South Carolina
1993/94.   Timothy W. Sineath, University of Kentucky
1992/93.   Adele M. Fasick, University of Toronto
1991/92.   Evelyn Daniel, University of North Carolina at Chapel Hill
1990/91.   Phyllis Van Orden, Florida State University

1980-1989

1989/90.   Miles M. Jackson, University of Hawaii at Manoa
1988/89.   Leigh Estabrook, University of Illinois
1987/88.   Kathleen M. Heim (Kathleen de la Peña McCook), Louisiana State University
1986/87.   Ann Prentice, University of Tennessee
1985/86.   Norman Horrocks, Dalhousie University
1984/85.   Jane B. Robbins, University of Wisconsin-Madison
1983/84.   Robert D. Stueart, Simmons College
1982/83.   F. William Summers, University of South Carolina
1981/82.   Harold Goldstein, Florida State University
1980/81.   Charles A. Bunge, University of Wisconsin-Madison

1970-1979

1979/80.   Genevieve Casey, Wayne State University
1978/79.   Gary R. Purcell, University of Tennessee
1977/78.   Margaret K. Goggin, University of Denver
1976/77.   Guy Garrison, Drexel University
1975/76.   Kenneth E. Vance, University of Michigan
1974/75.   Elizabeth W. Stone, Catholic University
1973/74.   R. Brian Land, University of Toronto
1972/73.   Thomas Slavens, University of Michigan
1971/72.   Margaret Monroe, University of Wisconsin-Madison
1970/71.   Patricia B. Knapp, Wayne State University

1960-1969

1969/70.   Rev. James J. Kortendick, Catholic University1968/69 Samuel Rothstein, University of British Columbia
1967/68.   Virginia Lacy Jones, Atlanta University
1966/67.   LeRoy C. Merritt, University of California
1965/66.   L. Dorothy Bevis, University of Washington
1964/65.   Jesse Shera, Case Western Reserve University
1963/64.   Wayne Yenawine, Syracuse University
1961/62.   Martha Boaz, University of Southern California
1960/61.   Edward A. Wight, University of California, Berkeley

1950-1959

1959/60.   David K. Berninghausen, University of Minnesota
1958/59.   Esther Stallmann, University of Texas
1957/58.   Lowell A. Martin, Rutgers University
1956/57.   Frances N. Cheney, Peabody University
1955/56.   Harold Lancour, University of Illinois
1954/55.   Louise LeFevre, Western Michigan University
1953/54.   Carl Melinat, Syracuse University
1952/53.   C. Irene Hayner, University of Minnesota
1951/52.   Rose B. Phelps, University of Illinois

1940-1949

1949/50.   J. Periam Danton, University of California, Berkeley
1948/49.   Rudolph H. Gjelness, University of Michigan
1947/48.   George C. Allez, University of Wisconsin, Madison
1946/47.   Florrinell F. Morton, Louisiana State University
1945/46.   Anne M. Boyd, University of Illinois
1944/45.   Alice Higgins, New Jersey
1943/44.   Frances H. Kelly, Carnegie Institute of Technology
1942/43.   Leon Carnovsky, University of Chicago
1941/42.   Herman H. Henkle, Simmons College
1940/41.   Lucie E. Fay, Columbia

1930-1939 

 1939/40.  Tommie Dora Barker, Emory    
 1938/39.   Louis Round Wilson, Chicago
 1937/38.   Harriet E. Howe, Denver    
 1936/37.   Ethel M. Fair, New Jersey    
 1935/36.   Ralph Munn, Carnegie Institute of Technology    
 1934/35.   Phineas L. Windsor, Illinois
 1933/34.   Sydney B. Mitchell, California    
 1932/33.   Arthur E. Bostwick, St. Louis Public    
 1931/32.    Clara E. Howard, Emory    
 1930/31.    Charles C. Williamson, Columbia

1920-1929 

 1929/30.   Charles C. Williamson, Columbia
 1928/29.   June R. Donnelly, Simmons College
 1927/28.   Josephine Adams Rathbone, Pratt
 1926/27.   Phineas L. Windsor, Illinois
 1925/26.   William E. Henry, Washington
 1924/25.   Susie Lee Crumley, Carnegie (Atlanta)
 1923/24.   Harriet P. Sawyer, St. Louis Public
 1922/23.   Ernest J. Reece, New York Public
 1921/22.   Phineas L. Windsor, Illinois
 1920/21.   Josephine Adams Rathbone, Pratt

1915-1920 

 1919/20.   Frank K. Walter, New York State
 1918/19.   Alice S. Tyler, Western Reserve
 1917/18.   Sarah C. N. Bogle, Carnegie Institute (Pittsburgh)
 1916/17.   June R. Donnelly, Simmons College
 1915/16.   James I. Wyer, New York State

References

External links 
Official website

Professional associations based in the United States
Library-related professional associations
Organizations established in 1915
Library science organizations